"Lessons" is the eighth episode of the first season of the HBO original series The Wire. The episode was written by David Simon from a story by David Simon and Ed Burns and was directed by Gloria Muzio. It originally aired on July 21, 2002.

Plot summary

The street
As Wallace helps one of his young charges with their math homework, Poot shows up and asks him to return to work. Wallace refuses to leave his room and asks to borrow money from Poot, who begrudgingly obliges. Afterward, Poot reports his concerns about Wallace to D'Angelo, who wants to talk with him face-to-face. Meanwhile, at the Barksdale-run print shop, Stringer scolds the staff for not acting like professionals. Wee-Bey, Stinkum and Savino raid Omar's apartment and torch his van while he watches from his hiding place across the street. Later, they pick up D'Angelo, who mentions Orlando's proposition; the others tell him that he should talk to Avon. Orlando is berated and beaten by Avon for even considering getting involved in dealing.

The soldiers throw a party celebrating Stinkum's promotion, which will be official as soon as they kill a dealer named Scar and chase his crew off his corner. Before leaving to buy more alcohol, D'Angelo notices an extremely inebriated dancer named Keisha being held by Wee-Bey against his chest; he regards D'Angelo coldly before he takes Keisha into a bedroom and shuts the door behind him. When D'Angelo returns, he finds Keisha's naked corpse lying on a bed in the room where Wee-Bey took her. D'Angelo is slightly shaken, while Wee-Bey appears disturbingly unconcerned; it is implied Keisha died of an overdose after Wee-Bey drugged and raped her.

Later, Shardene asks D'Angelo about Keisha, and he tells her that she was sick when he last saw her. They discuss his future and she tells him that if he is unhappy, he should do something else. As Wee-Bey and Stinkum prepare to hit Scar's corner, they are ambushed by Omar; Stinkum is killed while Wee-Bey is wounded. Avon increases the bounty on Omar, but Stringer suggests luring him into the open with the promise of a truce.

The police
McNulty spots Stringer while taking his sons to Northeast Market and has them follow him. McNulty briefly loses sight of his sons, but they manage to write down Stringer's license plate number. Bunk disapproves of McNulty involving his sons in the operation. Meanwhile, Herc and Carver prepare for their sergeant's exam. Prez and Greggs ask them to tail the pit crew to see which phones they are using now. Based on information gleaned from the wire, they pull over Senator Davis's driver, Damien "Day-Day" Price, and find a bag full of cash in his car.

Because of Price's political connections, Burrell demands that his men return the money and tells Daniels he will shut down the detail. Daniels tells Marla that his superiors dislike wiretaps because they know that drug money ties into politics. He also complains that McNulty asked what Burrell has on him; she asks him what he said, and he does not reply. Phelan calls McNulty into his chambers and asks about Burrell's order, and they agree to the opposition involved with it. The judge then threatens Burrell with a contempt charge if the wiretap is terminated prematurely. Later, McNulty tails Stringer and discovers he is taking an economics class at Baltimore City Community College.

The detail learns through the wiretaps about Omar's murder of Stinkum. McNulty and Greggs bring in Omar, but he denies any involvement. While at the detail, Omar spots a photo linking Avon to Orlando's club. Omar is unapologetic about his actions and the detectives have to let him go. Later, Omar observes the club from the shadows. Greggs goes to Freamon with her concerns that she caused Omar to volunteer as an eyewitness; Freamon assures Greggs that justice will be served even without Omar, as the ballistics matched. They discuss dancers at the club and pick out Shardene as a potential informant.

Bunk tells McNulty that Ray Cole has been assigned the task of solving Stinkum's murder. McNulty tells Bunk that Omar was the shooter and asks him to tell Cole they will give him a closed case once their case is finished, but acknowledges that because of Omar's assistance, he will not ultimately deliver him to Cole; both men regret the lie and go out drinking to soothe their consciences. They discuss the strange position of protecting Omar from the murder investigation. Bunk spots a woman he wishes to bed, and asks McNulty to cover for him with his wife. Later, McNulty is called by the woman to come and collect Bunk, who is so drunk that he decided to burn his clothes to destroy the evidence of his infidelity. McNulty brings Bunk home and deposits him in the empty bunk bed normally used by his sons. Bunk mumbles that McNulty is bad for the people around him before falling asleep.

Production
In the Homicide unit, Bunk is reading a book written by Laura Lippman.  Lippman is a Baltimore resident and is married to series creator David Simon.

Title reference
The title refers to the classes Stringer takes, Wallace teaching the math problems to the child in his charge, Judge Phelan showing his control over Burrell to McNulty, the sergeant's exam Herc and Carver take, Freamon teaching Kima about the use of instinct in solving cases, Kima learning that she made an error on the Omar witness case, and Omar teaching a lesson to the Barksdale soldiers. It may also refer to McNulty teaching his sons how to tag a suspect when he has them follow Stringer.

Epigraph

Omar uses this phrase while taunting Wee-Bey after shooting Stinkum.  It also relates to the chess discussion in episode #3.

Credits

Starring cast
Although credited, John Doman, Deirdre Lovejoy, and Andre Royo do not appear in this episode.

Guest stars

References

External links
"Lessons" at HBO.com

The Wire (season 1) episodes
2002 American television episodes
Television episodes written by David Simon